Josef "Joe" Saxinger (February 2, 1930 – July 3, 2008) was a German-born farmer, business owner and political figure in Saskatchewan. He represented Kinistino from 1986 to 1991 in the Legislative Assembly of Saskatchewan as a Progressive Conservative.

He was born in Niederbrünst and was educated in Haag and Passau. Saxinger trained as a tool and die maker. He came to Canada in 1954 and settled in the Cudworth district. Saxinger farmed, operated a car dealership, Saxinger Motors, and then operated Saxinger Farm Parts and Implements. He was later a partner in the Sagehill Buffalo Ranch. He was married twice: first to Eleonore Lobl in 1956 and then to Delphine Nielsen in 2006. Saxinger served as fire chief for Cudworth.

He was defeated by Armand Roy when he ran for reelection to the Saskatchewan assembly in 1991.

Electoral history

|-
 
|style="width: 130px"|Progressive Conservative
|Joe Saxinger
|align="right"|3,900
|align="right"|49.11%
|align="right"|-2.46
 
|NDP
|Don Cody
|align="right"|3,748
|align="right"|47.20%
|align="right"|+1.76

|- bgcolor="white"
!align="left" colspan=3|Total
!align="right"|7,941
!align="right"|100.00%
!align="right"|

|-
 
|style="width: 130px"|NDP
|Armand Roy
|align="right"|4,298
|align="right"|50.32%
|align="right"|+3.12
 
|Progressive Conservative
|Joe Saxinger
|align="right"|2,918
|align="right"|34.16%
|align="right"|-14.95

|- bgcolor="white"
!align="left" colspan=3|Total
!align="right"|8,542
!align="right"|100.00%
!align="right"|

References 

1930 births
2008 deaths
Progressive Conservative Party of Saskatchewan MLAs
West German emigrants to Canada
People from Passau (district)